Prakash Mehra (13 July 1939 – 17 May 2009) was a legendary Indian film director and producer known for his work in Hindi films. He was one of the pioneers of masala films, along with Nasir Hussain, and Manmohan Desai. His collaborations with the actor Amitabh Bachchan resulted in several box office blockbusters and classics.

Career

Born on 13 July 1939 in Bijnor, Uttar Pradesh, Mehra started in the late 1950s as a production controller. In 1968, he directed Shashi Kapoor who played a double role in Haseena Maan Jayegi. . In 1973, he produced and directed Zanjeer.  This hit with Amitabh Bachchan started a long term and successful collaboration that spanned 7 more films, 6 being blockbuster hits: Hera Pheri, Khoon Pasina, Muqaddar Ka Sikandar, Lawaaris, Namak Halaal and Sharaabi. Their final collaboration was  Jaadugar which was a flop and ended their successful streak. Zanjeer was the film credited with launching the career of Bachchan as a lead actor and their final film together Jaadugar was released towards the declining period of Bachchan's career.

Prakash Mehra also directed & produced Zindagi Ek Jua with actor Anil Kapoor in 1991, which was not a commercial success. In 1996, he introduced veteran actor Raaj Kumar's son Puru Raaj Kumar in Bal Bramhachari which was also unsuccessful. This was the last film he directed. He also produced the movie Dalaal with Mithun Chakraborty, in the mid-90s, which was a box-office moneymaker.  Mehra received a lifetime achievement award from the India Motion Picture Directors Association (IMPDA) in 2006. He also received Lifetime Achievement as Producer from IMPPA (Indian Motion Picture Producers Association) on 19 September 2008.

Prakash Mehra was one of the first Bombay directors to try venture into Hollywood. In the late eighties he tried a joint venture to make the movie The God Connection with Frank Yandolino. The movie was to include Hollywood actors such as Charles Bronson among others, but the project though funded heavily initially, never came to fruition.

Mehra died on 17 May 2009 in Mumbai of pneumonia and multiple organ failure.

Filmography

As director

As producer

References

External links

1939 births
2009 deaths
Deaths from multiple organ failure
Deaths from pneumonia in India
Hindi-language film directors
Film producers from Uttar Pradesh
People from Bijnor
20th-century Indian film directors
Film directors from Uttar Pradesh
People from Bijnor district